Yuquan Subdistrict is a subdistrict in Acheng District, Harbin, Heilongjiang, China. , it has two residential neighborhoods and four villages under its administration:
Neighborhoods
Henan Community
Rongxing Community

Villages
Mopan Village
Zhenbei Village
Laoying Village
Hongguang Village

See also 
 List of township-level divisions of Heilongjiang

References 

Township-level divisions of Heilongjiang
Harbin